The European Tour 2013/2014 – Event 7 (also known as the 2013 Antwerp Open) was a professional minor-ranking snooker tournament that took place between 14 and 17 November 2013 at the Lotto Arena in Antwerp, Belgium.

Judd Trump made the 99th official maximum break during his last 32 match against Mark Selby. This was Trump's first official 147 break and also the second maximum break in the 2013/2014 season.

Mark Allen was the defending champion, but he lost 1–4 against Joe Perry in the last 16.

Mark Selby won his 12th professional title by defeating Ronnie O'Sullivan 4–3 in the final.

Prize fund and ranking points
The breakdown of prize money and ranking points of the event is shown below:

1 Only professional players can earn ranking points.

Main draw

Preliminary rounds

Round 1
Best of 7 frames

Round 2
Best of 7 frames

Round 3
Best of 7 frames

Round 4
Best of 7 frames

Main rounds

Top half

Section 1

Section 2

Section 3

Section 4

Bottom half

Section 5

Section 6

Section 7

Section 8

Finals

Century breaks

 147, 111, 109, 108, 104  Judd Trump
 142, 130, 123, 108, 107, 100  Ronnie O'Sullivan
 138, 116  Kurt Maflin
 136, 110, 103  Mark Allen
 135  Ben Woollaston
 134, 133  Marco Fu
 134, 131, 121  Thepchaiya Un-Nooh
 133  Adam Duffy
 129  Nigel Bond
 127  Ryan Day
 126, 122, 107, 103  Mark Selby
 126  Pankaj Advani
 125, 108  Andrew Higginson

 125  Sean O'Sullivan
 120  Ian Burns
 118, 115  Ricky Walden
 118, 103, 103  Ding Junhui
 111  Joe Perry
 108  David Gilbert
 106  Liam Highfield
 106  Graeme Dott
 105  Mark Williams
 100  Sanderson Lam
 100  Fergal O'Brien
 100  Tony Drago

References

External links
 

2013
ET7
2013 in Belgian sport